Adilson dos Anjos Oliveira (born 23 November 1987), commonly known as Juninho, is a Brazilian footballer who captains and plays as a defensive midfielder for América Mineiro.

Career
Born in Goiânia, Goiás, Juninho started his career with Aparecida Esporte Clube in 2009, already aged 22. In July 2012, after a stint at Rio Verde, he moved to Mogi Mirim and played a part in the club's promotion campaign in the Série D.

On 28 May 2013, Juninho signed for Série A side Atlético Paranaense. He made his debut in the category on 1 June, coming on as a first-half substitute for Deivid in a 2–2 home draw against Flamengo.

After being deemed surplus to requirements, Juninho was loaned to Ponte Preta, Ferroviária and América Mineiro. He signed permanently with the latter on 7 February 2017, after agreeing to a two-year deal.

Career statistics

Honours
Rio Verde
Campeonato Goiano Segunda Divisão: 2011

References

External links
 

Living people
1987 births
Sportspeople from Goiânia
Brazilian footballers
Association football midfielders
Campeonato Brasileiro Série A players
Campeonato Brasileiro Série B players
Campeonato Brasileiro Série D players
Esporte Clube Rio Verde players
Mogi Mirim Esporte Clube players
Club Athletico Paranaense players
Associação Atlética Ponte Preta players
Associação Ferroviária de Esportes players
América Futebol Clube (MG) players